Toni Reis (born in 1964) is the president of the Brazilian LGBT organisation called Grupo Dignidade, the general secretary of the national association of Gays, Lesbians and Transsexuals in Brazil (Associação Brasileira de Gays, Lésbicas e Transgêneros/ABGLT) of which he was a founding president in 1995, and a member of the international council of the Hirschfeld Eddy Foundation.

He is a teacher and specialist in human sexuality and group dynamics. He possesses a master's degree of philosophy in ethics and sexuality.

Toni Reis is also the Latin American coordinator for ASICAL (Association for Integral Health and Citizenship in Latin America and the Caribbean).

Work
In 1998 Toni Reis described the situation in his country: "1,600 homosexuals have been murdered in the last ten years, of these 350 transvestites and 61 lesbians."

In 2006 he spoke before the Brazilian parliament, where he stated that 250 homosexuals per year are murdered in Brazil.

In 2007 he addressed the United Nations, in order to receive councillor status for his organization

Personal
In 2003, Toni Reis obtained a permanent Brazilian residence permit for his life partner, who was born in the United Kingdom, in a landmark court case for Brazil.

References

External links
 (in German) Toni Reis' fight against bigotry 

1964 births
Brazilian LGBT rights activists
LGBT Roman Catholics
Living people